The Di Lauro clan is an Italian crime clan, part of the Camorra in Naples. The clan operates in the neighbourhoods of Secondigliano, Scampìa, Miano, Marianella, Piscinola, and in the adjacent municipalities of Casavatore, Melito, Arzano, Villaricca and Mugnano (all in the province of Naples). At its peak, between the mid-1990s and the early 2000s, the organization was earning more than €500,000 a day from the sale of drugs alone, making Secondigliano the largest open-air drug market in Europe. The founder of the clan is Paolo Di Lauro (known as "Ciruzzo il milionario"), from Via Cupa dell'Arco, in Secondigliano.

History

The Italian Direzione Distrettuale Antimafia ("Antimafia District Directorate") first investigated the clan in 2002, which led to the imprisonment of its most influential members, including Abbinante clan boss Raffaele "Papale e Marano" Abbinante, who was aligned with Di Lauro, but Paolo Di Lauro managed to stay free. Despite this setback, the clan increased its power and the arrested members were replaced by several of Di Lauro's ten sons: Cosimo (b. 1973), Ciro (b. 1978) and Marco (b. 1980). At the same time, the coalition was strengthened with other clans in the Secondigliano Alliance. The clan's "old guard" lost its power, and some of Di Lauro's former faithful allies formed a rival alliance (Scissionisti di Secondigliano) and started a bloody power struggle in 2004, known as the Scampia feud.

According to the Anti-mafia authorities reports made in 2021, after more than a decade of a great weakening of the organization, thanks to the arrests of most of its members, the clan would in fact making a comeback, having an increasingly entrepreneurial vocation, and less and less engaged in extortion and other "street crimes". The Di Lauros would maintain its authority and economic solidity through recurrent remodeling its internal structures but in particular in new entrepreneurial strategies functional to money laundering. The organization's new leadership, which according to authorities is now headed by one of the sons of Paolo Di Lauro, is investing mainly in the international smuggling of foreign manufactured tobaccos and at the same time it is relaunching the counterfeiting affair all over Europe.

Activities

In the early 2000s, the clan's drug revenue from their sellers were reckoned by Italian investigators to be worth about €200 million per year.
In the time of the reign of Paolo Di Lauro, Secondigliano, the clan's stronghold, became the largest open-air narcotics market in Europe.

The Di Lauro clan funnelled the proceeds into real estate, buying dozens of flats in Naples, owning shops in France and the Netherlands, as well as businesses importing fur, fake fur and lingerie. Cosimo Di Lauro used to travel to Paris to control the business of the clan in France. In his visits to Paris, Cosimo often drove his Lamborghini around the city. The clan is also very active in counterfeit clothes in the Netherlands.

According to the pentito Antonio Accurso, the Di Lauro clan has several links to the Sacra Corona Unita in question with regards to drug trafficking.

The Di Lauro clan allegedly has a alliance with the Contini clan, particularly with Ciro Contini, the nephew of the boss Edoardo Contini. According to the pentito Domenico Esposito both clans have a pact with regards to the drug trafficking business.

On 12 July 2019, the Italian police confiscated €300 million, including 600 houses, lands, 16 cars and bank accounts belonging to Antonio Passarelli, a businessman believed to be connected to the Di Lauro clan.

In October 2021, the Spanish police arrested an important member of the organization in Málaga, he was in charge of the tobacco smuggling activities for the organization in Spain. According to police, he is a Spanish citizen, however his name was not revealed to the media.

Leadership
Paolo Di Lauro became a fugitive in 2002 and left the business to his sons Cosimo and Vincenzo Di Lauro (b. 1975).
Cosimo Di Lauro, known as "The Designer Don", was arrested in 2005 and sentenced to life in prison. Cosimo died in prison in June 2022.
Marco Di Lauro was arrested in Naples on 2 March 2019. Sentenced to life in prison.
Nunzio Di Lauro, was arrested on 3 March 2008.
According to the journalist Roberto Saviano, after Marco's arrest, the new leaders of the organization were Vincenzo and Ciro Di Lauro. 
Ciro Di Lauro was first arrested in late 2004. In February 2022, he was rearrested, accused of two murders that took place in 2004.
Vincenzo Di Lauro was arrested in March 2007. As of 2021, Vincenzo Di Lauro is under house arrest.
Salvatore Di Lauro, known as Terremoto (Earthquake), despite having a history of back and forth to prison, he was released from jail in September 2021.

Codes of conduct 
In the years when Paolo Di Lauro was in charge of the clan, he decreed several orders of conduct for his affiliates, among them, that it was forbidden to assassinate each other for economic reasons, if there were economic problems among the members or affiliates, a meeting of the organization's top management was called for a negotiation. Another rule was in relation to the constant territorial wars between the Camorra clans: in the Di Lauro clan, it was not allowed to assassinate members of rival clans for this reason, unless the entire chamber formed by all the clan leaders gave authorization to do so. The clan however is quite strict about extramarital affairs of its members and courting the partner of its members or affiliates. In this case, the murder of those who broke one of these two rules is allowed.

In popular culture

 Gomorrah (TV series) Inspired in the Di Lauro clan and in their war against the Scissionisti di Secondigliano led by Raffaele Amato.

See also

 List of members of the Camorra
 List of Camorra clans
 Marco Di Lauro
 Paolo Di Lauro
 Cosimo Di Lauro
 List of most wanted fugitives in Italy
 Camorra

References

Sources

External links
 Clan Di Lauro: ecco il menu dei boss, TG1, October 23, 208 on YouTube

 
1980s establishments in Italy
Camorra clans
Transnational organized crime
Organized crime groups in France
Organised crime groups in the Netherlands
Organised crime groups in Spain